The 1908 Berlin International Tournament was the first edition of the Berlin International Tournament, an international ice hockey tournament. It was held from 2 to 5 November 1908 in Berlin, Germany. Princes Ice Hockey Club of Great Britain won the tournament.

Tournament

First round

Semifinals

Final

References

External links
 Tournament on hockeyarchives.info

1908–09 in European ice hockey
Berlin International Tournament
ice hockey
1908–09 in German ice hockey